Sabz Pari Laal Kabootar is a Pakistani social drama serial directed by Babar Javed and Furqan Khan, produced by A&B Entertainment. The drama stars Faysal Qureshi, Nimra Bucha, Mohib Mirza and Sami Khan  in lead roles, and was first aired on 11 June 2012 on Geo Entertainment, where it airs on Monday at 8:00 p.m. It revolves around the several dark themes such as drug mafia, its addiction by common people and other hilarious crimes associated to it.

Plot 

Rafiq lives with his wife Sakina and young children, owns a lower class family and is a rickshaw driver by profession. He uses drugs and addicts to it. His urge for drugs reached him in a desperate state and he even sacrifices his children for it.

Cast
 Faysal Qureshi as Rafiq
 Mohib Mirza as Anjay
 Sami Khan as Shafiq
 Nimra Bucha as Sakina
 Zhalay Sarhadi as Najma
 Sarmad Khoosat as Arham
 Arij Fatyma as Maleeha
 Tahira Imam as Arham's mother
 Humaira Ali as Nasima
 Sohail Masood as Police Inspector
 Sajid Shah

References

External links 
 

Pakistani drama television series
2012 Pakistani television series debuts
A&B Entertainment TV series